Yasmine Jemai (born 12 June 1999) is a Tunisian football midfielder, who last played  for Kireçburnu Spor in the Turkish Women's Super League and plays in the Tunisia women's national team.

Club career 
Jemai has played for ES Sahel in Tunisia.

In December 2021, she moved to Turkey and joined Fatih Vatan Spor in Istanbul to play in the 2021–22 Turkish Super League. In the second half of the season, she transferred to Kireçburnu Spor. On 17 October 2022, she left Turkey for Saudi Arabia.

International career 
Jemai has capped for Tunisia at senior level, including two friendly away wins over Jordan in June 2021.

See also 
List of Tunisia women's international footballers

References

External links 

1999 births
Living people
People from Sousse
Tunisian women's footballers
Women's association football midfielders
Turkish Women's Football Super League players
Tunisia women's international footballers
Tunisian expatriate footballers
Tunisian expatriate sportspeople in Turkey
Expatriate women's footballers in Turkey
Fatih Vatan Spor players
Kireçburnu Spor players
20th-century Tunisian women
21st-century Tunisian women
Saudi Women's Premier League players